Rayleigh and Wickford is a constituency represented in the House of Commons of the UK Parliament since its 2010 creation by Mark Francois, a Conservative.

History 
The seat was created for the 2010 general election following a review of the Parliamentary representation of Essex by the Boundary Commission for England.  It was formed from the majority of the abolished constituency of Rayleigh, together with the town of Wickford, previously in the abolished constituency of Billericay.

Francois was previously Member of Parliament for Rayleigh.

Boundaries

The Borough of Basildon wards of Wickford Castledon, Wickford North, and Wickford Park
The District of Rochford wards of Ashingdon and Canewdon, Downhall and Rawreth, Grange, Hawkwell North, Hawkwell South, Hawkwell West, Hockley Central, Hockley North, Hockley West, Hullbridge, Lodge, Rayleigh Central, Sweyne Park, Trinity, Wheatley and Whitehouse.

Constituency profile
This small-town studded portion of rural Essex reaches out almost as far as the North Sea beside Rochford and has income levels on average slightly above the national average, low unemployment, and little social housing.

Members of Parliament

Elections

Elections in the 2010s

* Served as an MP in the 2005–2010 Parliament

See also
 List of parliamentary constituencies in Essex

Notes

References

Parliamentary constituencies in Essex
Constituencies of the Parliament of the United Kingdom established in 2010
Rayleigh, Essex